Bryaceae is a family of mosses.

Genera
Genera include:

Acidodontium 
Anomobryum  (e.g. Anomobryum julaceum)
Brachymenium 
Bryum 
Imbribryum 
Leptostomopsis  (formerly part of Bryum)
Mniobryoides 
Ochiobryum 
Osculatia 
Perssonia 
Plagiobryoides Plagiobryum Ptychostomum  (formerly part of Bryum)Rhodobryum  (e.g. Rhodobryum roseum)Roellobryon  (formerly known as Roellia)Rosulabryum''

References

 
Moss families